Dzintars is a Latvian masculine given name borne by more than 4,000 men in Latvia. The name means "amber". Its nameday is celebrated on 4 September.

The name is one of the relatively few surviving names of indigenous origin from the very great number either newly introduced, as Dzintars was, or revived during the Latvian National Awakening of the late 19th and early 20th centuries.

Individuals
The name Dzintars may refer to:
 Dzintars Ābiķis (born 1952), Latvian politician
 Dzintars Čīča  (born 1993), Latvian singer
 Dzintars Jaundžeikars (born 1956), Latvian politician
 Dzintars Krišjānis (born 1958), Latvian rower and Olympic competitor
 Dzintars Lācis (1940–1992), Latvian cyclist and Olympic competitor
 Dzintars Rasnačs (born 1963), Latvian politician
 Dzintars Sproģis (born 1971), Latvian footballer
 Dzintars Zirnis (born 1977), Latvian footballer

 As a surname
 Raivis Dzintars (born 1982), Latvian politician

References

Sources
 Pilsonības un Migrācijas Lietu Parvalde (PMLP): Office of Citizenship and Migration Affairs personal name database 
 Siliņš, Klāvs, 1990: Latviešu personvārdu vārdnīca. Rīga: Zinātne 

Latvian masculine given names